Riccardo Doratiotto (born 7 June 1999) is an Italian football player who plays for Arezzo.

Club career
He made his Serie A debut for Cagliari on 24 February 2019 in a game against Sampdoria, as a starter.

On 6 July 2019, he signed a 2-year contract with Olbia.

On 4 February 2022, Doratiotto signed with Arezzo in Serie D.

Personal life
His twin brother Fabio Doratiotto was raised in youth teams of Lecce and plays in Serie D for Arzachena, as of January 2022.

References

External links
 

1999 births
Twin sportspeople
Italian twins
Sportspeople from Cagliari
Footballers from Sardinia
Living people
Italian footballers
Association football forwards
Cagliari Calcio players
Olbia Calcio 1905 players
Montevarchi Calcio Aquila 1902 players
S.S. Arezzo players
Serie A players
Serie C players
Serie D players